John Beverly Pollard (November 9, 1880 – October 2, 1960) was an American college football player and coach and surgeon in the Medical Corps of the United States Navy.

Early years
Pollard was born on November 9, 1880, in Aylett, Virginia, to E. S. Pollard, Esq.

University of Virginia
Pollard was an All-Southern quarterback for the Virginia Cavaliers of the University of Virginia, and a member of the Virginia Glee Club. He also played on the baseball teams. At Virginia he was a member of the Kappa Sigma fraternity. Pollard was known for his speed. He mentored the backup Oscar Randolph. He was once University Demonstrator of Anatomy. After university he became a captain and surgeon in the US Navy Medical Corps.

Coaching career
Pollard coached Virginia's baseball team in 1906. He served as a co-head football coach at Davidson College in Davidson, North Carolina from 1906 to 1907.

Head coaching record

Football

References

External links
 

1880 births
1960 deaths
American football quarterbacks
Davidson Wildcats football coaches
Virginia Cavaliers baseball players
Virginia Cavaliers baseball coaches
Virginia Cavaliers football players
Virginia Cavaliers football coaches
All-Southern college football players
United States Navy captains
United States Navy Medical Corps officers
People from King William County, Virginia
Coaches of American football from Virginia
Players of American football from Virginia
Baseball coaches from  Virginia
Baseball players from  Virginia